Gadariya is a village development committee in Kailali District in Sudurpashchim Province of western Nepal. At the time of the 1991 Nepal census it had a population of 7355 living in 726 individual households. It has a main school named "Shree Janta Higher Secondary school."which is established in 2014 B.S. It has also a beautiful lake which name is Koilahee taal, and it is second biggest lake of Sudurpaschimanchal.

References

External links
UN map of the municipalities of Kailali District

Populated places in Kailali District